Ngohide Ruby Ann GyangGyang, better known by her stage name Ruby Gyang, is a Nigerian singer and songwriter. She is currently signed to Chocolate City.

Life and career 
Ruby Gyang was born in Jos, Plateau State, where she spent her early years. Her journey to stardom begun when she formed Loopy Music alongside MI, Ice Prince and Jesse Jagz. Ruby Gyang has worked and collaborated with artists such as MI, Jesse Jagz, Show Dem Camp, Ice Prince and Bez. Ruby Gyang joined Chocolate City Music after Loopy Music's merger with Chocolate City Music in 2015. She has released an EP under the label.

Discography 
Studio albums
This is Love (2016)

Singles 

 Kale Ni
Oh Holy Night
 Oya Dance
 Crushing 
 Har Abada (feat. Classiq and Kheengz)

References 

21st-century Nigerian women singers
Living people
Year of birth missing (living people)